The following is a list of performances by American actress Susan Sarandon.

Filmography

Film

Television

Documentaries

Radio

Video games

Music videos

See also
 List of awards and nominations received by Susan Sarandon

References

External links
 

Actress filmographies
American filmographies